Lakeview is an area of Port Arthur, Texas, United States that used to be a distinct unincorporated community in Jefferson County.

In 1929 residents successfully opposed Port Arthur's attempt to annex Lakeview. By 1980 Port Arthur had annexed Lakeview.

Education
Lakeview is within the Port Arthur Independent School District.

External links

Port Arthur, Texas
Geography of Jefferson County, Texas
Former cities in Texas